Lloyd Reid "Low" Christenbury (October 19, 1893 – December 13, 1944) is a former Major League Baseball player. He played four seasons with the Boston Braves from 1919 to 1922.

References

External links

Boston Braves players
1893 births
1944 deaths
Baseball players from North Carolina
Major League Baseball outfielders
Major League Baseball second basemen
Newnan Cowetas players
Columbia Comers players
Memphis Chickasaws players
Indianapolis Indians players
Davidson Wildcats baseball players